AdVerif.ai is an artificial intelligence (AI) company that provides brand safety and ad verification solutions for brands and advertisers. It specializes in automatically identifying disinformation and fake news with FakeRank, a proprietary news quality measure.

AdVerif.ai was founded in 2017 by computer scientist Or Levi.

AdVerif.ai's technology uses machine learning and natural language processing to automatically detect questionable content. The technology is being used by fact-checking organizations in Europe and the US to identify and debunk disinformation.

Notes

External links
 Official website

Advertising